Húsavík Airport (regionally also )  is an airport serving Húsavík, Iceland.

The Gardur non-directional beacon (Ident: GA) (4.1 nautical miles) and the Husavik non-directional beacon (Ident: HS) (1.1 nautical miles) are located off the threshold of runway 03.

Airlines and destinations

Statistics

Passengers and movements

See also 
 Transport in Iceland
 List of airports in Iceland

Notes

References

External links 

 OpenStreetMap - Húsavík
 OurAirports - Húsavík

Airports in Iceland
Húsavík